Justice Smith (born 1995) is an American actor.

Justice Smith may also refer to:

Abram D. Smith (1811–1865), associate justice of the Wisconsin Supreme Court 
Carsten Smith (born 1932), chief justice of the Supreme Court of Norway
Charles Z. Smith (1927–2016), associate justice of the Washington Supreme Court
Clark Allen Smith (1846–1921), associate justice of the Kansas Supreme Court
Clyde E. Smith (1897–1971), associate justice of the Texas Supreme Court
Cotesworth P. Smith (1807–1862), associate justice and chief justice of the Supreme Court of Mississippi
Elbert B. Smith (1921–2013), associate justice of the Idaho Supreme Court
Ellison G. Smith (1854–1935), associate justice of the South Dakota Supreme Court
Frank G. Smith (1872–1950), associate justice of the Arkansas Supreme Court
George Bundy Smith (1937–2017), justice of the New York Court of Appeals
George Rose Smith (1911–1992), associate justice of the Arkansas Supreme Court
George T. Smith (1916–2010), associate justice of the Supreme Court of Georgia
George W. Smith (judge) (1820s–1873), associate justice of the Texas Supreme Court
Griffin Smith (1885–1955), associate justice of the Arkansas Supreme Court
Harvey W. Smith (died 1895), associate justice of the Utah Supreme Court
Henry C. Smith (judge) (1862–1932), justice of the Montana Supreme Court
Henry G. Smith (1807–1878), associate justice of the Tennessee Supreme Court
Isaac Smith (New Jersey politician) (1740–1807), associate justice of the Supreme Court of New Jersey
Isaac W. Smith (New Hampshire politician) (1825–1898), associate justice of the New Hampshire Supreme Court
Israel Smith (1759–1810), chief justice of the Vermont Supreme Court
James Francis Smith (1859–1928), associate Justice of the Supreme Court of the Philippines
James W. Smith Jr. (born 1943), Chief of the Supreme Court of Mississippi
Janet Smith (judge) (born 1940), Lord Justice of Appeal of the Court of Appeal of England and Wales
Jeremiah Smith (lawyer) (1759–1842), chief justice of the Supreme Judicial Court of New Hampshire
June C. Smith (1876–1947), chief justice of the Supreme Court of Illinois
Lavenski Smith (born 1958), associate justice of the Arkansas Supreme Court
Lemuel F. Smith (1890–1956), justice of the Supreme Court of Appeals of Virginia
Lemuel Augustus Smith (1878–1950), associate justice of the Supreme Court of Mississippi
Lemuel Augustus Smith Jr. (1904–2001), associate justice of the Supreme Court of Mississippi
Marvin H. Smith (1916–2010), associate justice of the Maryland Court of Appeals
Milford K. Smith (1906–1984), associate justice of the Vermont Supreme Court
Nathaniel Smith (1762–1822), associate justice of the Connecticut Supreme Court
Noah Smith (judge) (1756–1812), associate justice of the Vermont Supreme Court
Otis M. Smith (1922–1994), first African American justice of the Michigan Supreme Court
Patricia M. Smith (born c. 1953), associate justice of the Alabama Supreme Court
Robert Smith (Canadian judge) (1858–1942), puisne justice of the Supreme Court of Canada
Robert L. Smith (judge) (1918–1999), associate justice of the Nebraska Supreme Court
Robert S. Smith (born 1944), associate judge of the New York Court of Appeals
Seward Smith (1830–1887), associate justice of the Dakota Territory Supreme Court
St. Clair Smith (1889–1988), associate justice of the South Dakota Supreme Court
Steven Wayne Smith (born 1961), associate justice of the Texas Supreme Court
Sydney M. Smith (1869–1948), associate justice and chief justice of the Supreme Court of Mississippi
Theophilus W. Smith (1784–1845), associate justice of the Illinois Supreme Court
Thomas Smith (Pennsylvania judge) (1745–1809), associate justice of the Supreme Court of Pennsylvania 
Thomas Smith (Indiana judge) (born 1805; fl. 1840s–1850s), associate justice of the Supreme Court of Indiana
William Smith (judge, born 1728) (1728–1793), chief justice of the Province of Quebec
William A. Smith (Iowa judge) (1870–1958), associate justice of the Iowa Supreme Court
William A. Smith (Kansas judge) (1888–1968), associate justice of the Kansas Supreme Court
William J. Smith (Arkansas judge) (c. 1909–2000), associate justice of the Arkansas Supreme Court
Sir William James Smith (1853–1912), British judge who served as the chief justice of the Supreme Court of Cyprus, British Guiana and the Transvaal
William Nathan Harrell Smith (1812–1889), chief justice of the North Carolina Supreme Court
William Redwood Smith, associate justice of the Kansas Supreme Court
William W. Smith (Arkansas judge), associate justice of the Arkansas Supreme Court

See also
Smith Thompson, associate justice of the United States Supreme Court
Judge Smith (disambiguation)
Justice Smyth (disambiguation)